Cirridae is an extinct family of fossil sea snails, marine gastropod mollusks in the superfamily Porcellioidea (according to the taxonomy of the Gastropoda by Bouchet & Rocroi, 2005).

These snails date from the Mesozoic era, and are sinistral in their shell-coiling.

Taxonomy 
This family consists of three following subfamilies (according to the taxonomy of the Gastropoda by Bouchet & Rocroi, 2005):
 Cirrinae Cossmann, 1916
 Platyacrinae Wenz, 1938 - synonym: Hesperocirrinae O. Haas, 1953
 Cassianocirrinae Bandel, 1993

Genera and species
Genera and species within the family Cirridae include:
 Alaskacirrus Frýda & Blodgett, 1998 - from the Devonian of west-central Alaska
 Alaskacirrus bandeli Frýda & Blodgett, 1998

References